Calliopsis zonalis is a species of bee in the family Andrenidae. It is found in North America.

Subspecies
These two subspecies belong to the species Calliopsis zonalis:
 Calliopsis zonalis sierrae (Rozen, 1958)
 Calliopsis zonalis zonalis

References

Further reading

 
 

Andrenidae
Articles created by Qbugbot
Insects described in 1879